Hockey Club Lev Poprad (Lion), was a professional ice hockey team and a former member of the Kontinental Hockey League (KHL) based in Poprad, Slovakia. The Lev existed for only one year, playing in the 2011–12 KHL season.

History
The team was originally called HC Lev Hradec Kralove and was based in Hradec Králové, Czech Republic. It had been intended to join the KHL for the 2010–11 season, for which it fulfilled all necessary conditions except that the Czech Ice Hockey Association refused to give permission to the club. Because of that, Lev's management decided to move the club to Slovakia, and was accepted by the KHL's administration to participate in the league in the 2010–11 season. However, the KHL later excluded the team from the league for the 2010–11 season because the team was not part of any national ice hockey governing body.

After further efforts, including joining the Slovak Ice Hockey Federation, Lev Poprad was officially admitted to the KHL in May 2011. During the 2011–12 season, they played in the Bobrov division of the KHL, while HK Poprad continued playing their Slovak Extraliga matches in the same arena.

2011–12 season
Almost two months after being officially admitted to the KHL, Lev announced the signings of the first five players on 30 June 2011. In the final roster, the majority of the players were from Slovakia and Czech Republic. Head coach was Radim Rulík and the team captain was Ľuboš Bartečko. Lev's regular season was planned to start on 10 September 2011 with a match at home against Avangard Omsk, but because of the 2011 Lokomotiv Yaroslavl plane crash, the start of the season was postponed and Lev had their first game on 12 September against Metallurg Magnitogorsk. However, for their first win they had to wait until the sixth game, a 2–0 away win against Dinamo Riga on 26 September. Lev also failed to qualify for the play-offs and ended the season as 21st overall, with 54 points from 54 games. The team's top scorer was Ľuboš Bartečko with 30 points (16 goals and 14 assists).

New team in Prague
Late in the 2011–12 season, a change of owners renewed speculation about a move to Prague, Czech Republic. In March 2012, the Czech Ice Hockey Association granted permission for a KHL team to play in the Czech Republic, and at the end of April, a newly found team with the same name, HC Lev, but as a different organization, officially applied to the KHL to play in Prague. The Poprad-based HC Lev was disbanded after only one season.

Season-by-season record

Note: GP = Games played, W = Wins, OTW = Overtime Wins, SOW = Penalty Shootout Wins, SOL = Penalty Shootout Losses, L = Losses, GF = Goals for, GA = Goals against, Pts = Points

Franchise history

Milestones

Franchise scoring leaders

These are the top-ten point-scorers in KHL franchise history.

''Note: Pos = Position; GP = Games played; G = Goals; A = Assists; Pts = Points; P/G = Points per game

Tatranski Vlci
Affiliated with Lev Poprad were the Tatranski Vlci (Tatra Wolves), a junior team playing in the Northwest division of the Junior Hockey League (MHL). The team consisted of Czech and Slovak players born 1990 or later. They played their home games in nearby Spišská Nová Ves. Just as HC Lev, the Vlci were also disbanded after only one season.

References

See also

 HC Lev Praha

 
Ice hockey teams in Slovakia
Sport in Poprad
Ice hockey clubs established in 2010
Former Kontinental Hockey League teams
Sports clubs disestablished in 2012
2010 establishments in the Czech Republic
2012 disestablishments in Slovakia